Paulo Henrique Soares Pereira (born 30 January 1993), known as Paulo Henrique, is a Brazilian footballer who plays as a left-back who plays for São Caetano.

Club career
Born in São Paulo, Paulo Henrique graduated from Santos' youth setup. He made his professional debut on 2 February 2012, against Botafogo-SP for the Campeonato Paulista championship.

On 1 July 2013, after featuring rarely with the first team, and after the signing of Eugenio Mena, Paulo Henrique rescinded with Santos and signed a three-year deal with Rio Ave. However, his deal later collapsed, after he failed medical due to an anterior cruciate ligament injury.

On 28 January 2014 Paulo Henrique signed a one-year deal with Palmeiras. On 21 May, after failing to appear with his new side, he was loaned to América-RN until December.

On 5 January 2015 Paulo Henrique signed for Portuguesa, freshly relegated to Série C.

Career statistics

References

External links

1993 births
Living people
Brazilian footballers
Footballers from São Paulo
Association football defenders
Campeonato Brasileiro Série B players
Santos FC players
Sociedade Esportiva Palmeiras players
América Futebol Clube (RN) players
Clube Náutico Capibaribe players
Associação Portuguesa de Desportos players
Esporte Clube Tigres do Brasil players
São Bernardo Futebol Clube players
Santa Cruz Futebol Clube players
Novoperário Futebol Clube players
Clube Atlético Juventus players
Sociedade Esportiva do Gama players
Concórdia Atlético Clube players
Portimonense S.C. players
PFC Cherno More Varna players
Clube do Remo players
Associação Desportiva São Caetano players
Brazilian expatriate footballers
Brazilian expatriate sportspeople in Portugal
Brazilian expatriate sportspeople in Bulgaria
Expatriate footballers in Portugal
Expatriate footballers in Bulgaria